Tabacalera may refer to:

Places 
 Colonia Tabacalera, a neighbourhood in Mexico City
 La Tabacalera de Lavapiés, cultural and social center in Madrid, Spain
Tabacalera House, heritage house in San Fernando, Philippines
Tabacalera, barangay in Pateros, Philippines

Companies 
 A.J. Fernandez Cigars, cigar brand in Nicaragua, originally named Tabacalera Fernandez
Arturo Fuente, a cigar brand in Florida, USA also known as Tabacalera A. Fuente
Oliva Cigar Co., cigar brand in Nicaragua, originally named Tabacalera Oliva Tabolisa
Perdomo (cigar brand), cigar brand in Nicaragua, sold worldwide by the name Tabacalera Perdomo
Tabacalera, a Spanish tobacco monopoly of 1636
 Tabacalera del Este, Paraguay's largest cigarette manufacturer